This article is about the phonology and phonetics of standard Slovene.

Consonants 
Slovene has 24 distinctive consonant phonemes, of those only 21 are more common:

  are bilabial, whereas  are labiodental.
  are dental ; i.e.,  are laminal denti-alveolar, while  are dentalized laminal alveolar, pronounced with the blade of the tongue very close to the upper front teeth, with the tip of the tongue resting behind the lower front teeth.
  are alveolar. The first two are laminal denti-alveolar  before dental consonants.
The pronunciation varies between native speakers, but generally they all oppose 'typical' long trill.
  is uvular in a number of Upper Carniolan and Carinthian dialects, but such pronunciation is not allowed in Standard Slovene.
  is usually pronounced a bit more aspirated and it becomes fully aspirated  before close vowels.
  spirantized into  on a large portion of the Slovene-speaking area (all Littoral dialects, most Rovte dialects, some parts of the Upper Carniolan dialects, the western Carinthian dialects), or even further into  or even disappeared altogether.
  is usually described as the sequence  (with an epenthetic ). Jones (2002) found that a vocalic segment similar to  occurs before (and occasionally after) both syllabic and non-syllabic , and that it is shorter than epenthetic , leading to the conclusion that this is not epenthetic , but simply a feature of rhotic consonant production in Slovene.

 has several allophones depending on context.

 Before a vowel, the pronunciation is labiodental, .
 Before or after a vowel, the pronunciation is bilabial  and forms a diphthong.
 At the beginning of a syllable, before a consonant (for example in vsi 'all'), the pronunciation varies more widely by speaker and area. Many speakers convert  into a full vowel  in this position. For those speakers that retain a consonantal pronunciation, it pre-labializes the following consonant. Thus, vsi may be pronounced as disyllabic  or monosyllabic .
 In some dialects  turned into  instead of // and devoices as a normal obstruent (see consonant changes), so vsi would in those dialects be pronounced .

The preposition v is always bound to the following word and it is always pronounced as  except when standing alone out of a sentence (the pronunciation then is ).

Under certain (somewhat unpredictable) circumstances, historical  at the end of a syllable has become  (or  after ). This change has occurred in the endings of all past participles ending in vowel + l. For many derivatives of words ending in  that historically had , both  and  can be used, sometimes depending on the context it is being used in.

 and  have different pronunciations before some sonorants:

Similarly,  and  also change their pronunciations:

Bigger dialectal variations 
Slovene has many dialects, which have its own consonant changes. Some of the changes that impact only one consonant are already listed above and more general changes that impact more consonants, as well as two distinctions that are not present in standard language anymore are listed here.

Palatal sonorants 
Alpine Slovene, the transitional language between Proto-Slavic and Slovene, had five palatal consonants: j , ĺ , ń , ŕ  and t’ . Therefore, Standard Slovene allows three different pronunciations in this case:

Elsewhere, this pronunciation is considered archaic.
 Speakers of dialects which completely lost the distinction between palatal and non-palatal  and  pronounce them the same also in the Standard language.

tʼ–č distinction 
The tʼ–č distinction is one of the two distinctions that was present in Alpine Slovene and is still present in some dialects, but is not present in standard language anymore. Therefore, this distinction is either dialectal or obsolete. Examples, where the difference can be observed are sveča  (with distinction)  (without distinction) 'candle', teči  (with distinction)  (without distinction) 'to run' and hočem  (with distinction)  (without distinction) '(I) want'.

Shvapanye, elkanye, vekanye and *ł 
Some dialects still retain the original pronunciation (e.g., Horjul, Lower Carniolan, Inner Carniolan and Upper Savinja dialects. In standard language, shvapanye is only somewhat present, as described above. Elkanye and vekanye is the hypercorrect way of pronouncing words, without shvapanye.

Slekanye 
Apart from that area, it is also known for a part of the Torre Valley dialect.

tl/dl–t/d distinction 
Proto-Slavic consonant clusters *tl and *dl simplified quite soon in central, southern and eastern areas while it disappeared later from western and northern dialects. Today, the only dialect that still retains this distinction is the Gail Valley dialect. The clusters tl and dl that are nowadays present in the standard language became such after the omission of *ь/*ъ between the consonants. The distinction can be seen in the word vile  (Gail Valley dialect without any other dialectal changes)  (all other dialects).

Consonant changes 
The pronunciation of a consonant can be influenced by its surroundings, which is not necessarily reflected in the orthography.

First Slavic palatalization 

Second Slavic palatalization 

Iotation 
Iotation is the change of a consonant when  follows and they merge together in one or more sounds:

Dissimilation 
When a stop or affricate is followed by another stop or affricate, it dissimilates into a fricative, e. g. bedak  'idiot' + -ski  → bedaški  'idiotic' and k  'to' + grobu  'grave' → h grobu  'to the grave'.

Assimilation 
There are two types of assimilation in Slovene; a consonant can either match the following consonant by voice or by the place of articulation (or both).

All voiced obstruents are devoiced at the end of prosodic words unless immediately followed by a word beginning with a vowel or a voiced consonant. In consonant clusters, voicing distinction is neutralized and all consonants assimilate the voicing of the rightmost segment. The consonant pairs are given in this table:

Consonant clusters in non-assimilated words can be excluded from this rule, for example podcast  'podcast'.

Nasal ,  also match the place of articulation with the following consonant: Istanbul 'Istanbul' , informacija 'information' , banka 'bank'  (but they do not change change articulation before post-alveolar consonants and  also does not have allophone ).

Gemination of consonants 
Several consonant clusters also get simplified into geminated consonants. In fast speech, however, they change into usual, non-geminated consonants.
 When two or (rarely) more of the same consonants are pronounced one after another, they become geminated, taking the allophone of the first one; e.g., brezzob 'toothless' .

Vowels 

Slovene was long thought to have an eight-vowel system, however newer research (done mostly by Peter Jurgec) suggests that the number of vowels is different between tonal and non-tonal varieties of Slovene which have nine and eleven vowels, respectively.

 Stressed front vowels are in most words pronounced as lax  when  follows, so that, e.g., mira 'myrrh' is pronounced  and večer 'evening' is pronounced , but loanwords are exceptions, such as virus  and vera .
 If a vowel appears at the beginning of a word, a glottal stop  is inserted before: ura  'clock, watch', rt  'cape, headland'.

Jurgec proposes the existence of a ninth vowel  in tonemic variety that in traditional pronunciation (see below under Prosody) would rather be analyzed as a short .

The near-open  can only appear in the word-final stressed syllable before the syllable coda, as in čas  'time'. Due to the restrictions stated above, the open  usually appears in its place in other declinational forms of the same word: časa , not , 'time (gen.)'. The analysis as two different phonemes is also reinforced by the fact that in some words the phoneme  appears in the very same position that would permit , leading to a phonemic contrast: pas , not , 'belt'.

Jurgec also states that in the tonemic varieties of the language, the near-open vowel  can carry only the high tone (see below), which is "parallel to the pattern for the [,  and ]." On the basis of these observations he concludes that the near-open vowel  "behaves in a systematic way within the vowel system of Slovenian."

He also says that "[d]escriptions of schwa distribution are offer[ed] in lexical rather than grammatical terms. These were also based on historical data and did not consider actual speech of educated speakers in Ljubljana, nowadays considered standard."

Slovene has been traditionally described as distinguishing vowel length, which correlates with stress and is therefore discussed in the prosody section, below. When short or unstressed, they are not distinguished: short stressed variants are realized as open-mid , while the unstressed variants are, broadly speaking, true-mid vowels . In fact, however, the unstressed mid vowels have two realizations:

 Lowered close-mid (between close-mid and true-mid)  before a stressed syllable (as in velikan 'giant' and oglas 'advertisement').
 Raised open-mid (between true-mid and open-mid)  after a stressed syllable (as in medved 'bear' and potok 'stream').

The unstressed mid vowels are never as close as the stressed close-mid vowels  and never as open as the stressed open-mid vowels . One could therefore argue that the unstressed mid vowels are simply allophones of the close-mid vowels, whereas the open-mid vowels do not occur in unstressed positions. These allophones have neither advanced nor retracted tongue root.

In most cases, unstressed vowels are nowadays written as  before the stress and as  after the stress, however old way of writing them as  everywhere is still very common (e. g., in Toporišič 2001).

In some loanwords, sonorant clusters may be present that are required to form a new syllable in Slovene.

When the word becomes assimilated or any affixes are added, they become vernacularized. The pronunciation, however, varies widely between speakers depending on their knowledge of German. Here, the phonemes are given for a really educated person and the first change to go in pronunciation of  qualitatively different that .

In the colloquial spoken language, unstressed and most short stressed vowels tend to be reduced or elided. For example, kȕp ('heap') > , právimo ('we say') > .

Syllable breaks 
Standard Slovene does not really have diphthongs. In all other cases, two following vowels form two different syllables, e. g. poenostaviti 'simplify' . When two vowels are pronounced one after another, they are usually pronounced as would be expected.

Dialectal variation 
Number of vowels varies drastically between dialects. For example, Tolmin dialect has 3 long vowels, while some Carinthian microdialects can have 15 or even more long vowels. However, most dialects at least differentiate between one e-like vowel and the other two. In fact, Standard Slovene has one of the most simplified vowel systems of all dialects. Also not common for other dialects is that it does not contain any diphthongs as they all monophthongized.

While long vowels tend to be diphthongized, short vowels tend to be reduced because of modern vowel reduction, which is also common in colloquial spoken language.

The most common pronunciation difference between speakers is  vs.  and  vs.  as the dialectal distribution is inconsistent with the distribution in Standard Slovene. This influences the way speakers of such dialects speak Standard Slovene.

vs.  
'(I) am' is now pronounced  and 'here' is now pronounced .

Prosody 

Slovene has free stress: stress can occur on any syllable and is not predictable. The same word can be stressed quite differently in different dialects. Most words have a single syllable that carries stress. Some compounds, but not all, have multiple stressed syllables, inherited from the parts that make up the compound. There are also a few small words and clitics, including prepositions, that have no inherent stress at all and attach prosodically to another word.

Vowel length 

Slovene is traditionally analysed as having a distinction between long and short vowels. Stress and vowel length are closely intertwined:

 A non-final syllable that bears stress will automatically have a long vowel. Conversely, at most one vowel in a Slovene word is long, and it automatically bears the stress.
 If a word has no long vowels, the stress usually falls on the final syllable. However, a limited number of words have non-final stress on short syllables.
 Schwa  can also be stressed non-finally, but has no length distinctions.

Vowel length carries a low functional load: it is distinctive only in stressed final syllables, which can be either long or short. In other syllables, however, whether vowel length or stress, or both, are phonemic depends on the underlying phonological analysis. Generally speaking, stress and length co-occur in all but the final syllable, so one feature or the other is phonetically redundant in those words.

Recently, scholars have found that vowel length in standard Slovene is no longer distinctive, and that the only differences in vowel length are that the stressed vowels are longer than the unstressed ones, and that stressed open syllables are longer than stressed closed syllables. Stressed syllables are characterized by amplitude and pitch prominence.

Accent shifts 
Standard Slovene has undergone two accent shifts since Alpine Slovene. The first one, which happened in the 15th century, is from open short final syllables to the mid-close syllable before in words with two syllables, e. g. žena 'wife'  → . The original accentuation is retained in a part of Rosen Valley, Resian, Natisone Valley, Torre Valley and southern part of Soča dialects and is considered obsolete in Standard Slovene.

The second accent shift was from short final syllable to the mid vowel  in the syllable before, e. g. megla 'fog'  →  (→ ). This change did not happen in all the aforementioned dialects, as well as Upper and Lower Carniolan dialects.

Other two common accent shifts, that are not present in Standard Slovene are from all short final ( → ) and from all long circumflex final ( → ). The first one happened in Tolmin, Cerkno, Črni Vrh, Horjul, Karst, Inner Carniolan, Istrian, Kostel, Čabranka, South White Carniolan and North White Carniolan dialects, as well as all Styrian dialects, except Lower Sava Valley dialect and the second one happened in Gail Valley dialect without the subdialect, Resian, Torre Valley, Črni Vrh, Poljane, eastern part of Rosen Valley, Jaun, Mežica, North Pohorje–Remšnik, Upper Savinja, Central Savinja, South Pohorje, Kostel, Čabranka, North White Carniolan and South White Carniolan dialects.

Tone 

The standard language has two varieties, tonemic and non-tonemic. Tonemic varieties distinguish between two tones or pitch contours on stressed syllables, while non-tonemic varieties do not make this distinction. The tonemic varieties are found in a north–south band in the center of the country (Gail Valley, Rosen Valley, Ebriach, most of Jaun Valley, Natisone Valley, Torre Valley, Soča, a lesser part of Tolmin, Upper Carniolan without the subdialect, most of Selca, Horjul, Poljane, and Lower Carniolan dialects, a well as southwestern part of South White Carniolan dialect). Dialects in the eastern and south-western part of Slovenia are non-tonemic. However, because the Slovenian capital city Ljubljana is located within the central tonemic dialect area, phonemic tone was included in the standard language, and in fact the tonemic variety is more prestigious and is universally used in formal TV and radio broadcasts.

The two tones are:

 A low-pitch contour, also known as "acute". It is indicated with an acute diacritic  on long syllables, a grave  on short syllables.
 A high-pitch contour, also known as "circumflex". It is indicated with an inverted breve diacritic  on long syllables, a double grave  on short syllables.

The exact distribution and phonetic realization of tonemes varies locally. In Standard Slovene, some words may have either an acute or circumflex tone, with the chosen tone differing by speaker. Unless otherwise noted, this article discusses the tonemes as they are realized in Standard Slovene spoken in Ljubljana.

Tone is differentiated only on the stressed and on the last syllables, where it is the opposite of the tone that stressed syllable has (except in some prepositions). If last syllable is stressed, then they merge and form rising (acute) or falling (circumflex) tone; e.g., pot  /  'path'. Other vowels have neutral (mid) tone. vowels are mid tone in none-tonemic variety.

Not all types of syllables have a distinction between the two tones:

 All long vowels distinguish the two tones.
 Tautosyllabic stressed  (i.e.,  not directly followed by a vowel in the same word) can also distinguish the two tones. It is considered "long" for this purpose, for example pȓstnica ('phalanx') with high/falling tone vs. pŕstanəc ('finger') with low/rising tone.
 For the schwa  (when not part of the  combination), the two tones are mostly in complementary distribution: it is circumflex in final syllables and acute elsewhere. This is the only case where a stressed short acute vowel can occur.
 All other stressed short vowels are always realised with a circumflex tone. They are mostly restricted to final syllables.

This leads to the following possible combinations of tone, length and vowel quality (note that unstressed vowels have diacritical marks often omitted):

The non-tonemic system is identical to the tonemic system above in terms of vowel length and stress, but lacks any phonemic tone. This means that, for those dialects, the first four rows merge, as do the next three. Similarly, for speakers who do not distinguish short and long vowels, the first and third rows merge, as do the second and fourth.

Secondary stress 
Longer words, particularly loanwords, also have secondary stress. It always appears in words and word clusters when words do not have primary stress. Secondary stressed is usually every second syllable before and after the syllable with primary stress; e.g., aerofotogrametrija  'aerophotogrammetry'. Secondarily stressed open-mid vowels also become close-mid.

Sample 
The sample text is a reading of the first sentence of The North Wind and the Sun.

Phonetic transcription

Slovene national phonetic transcription 
The given phonetic transcription is how the pronunciation would be written in Slovene dictionaries, using Slovene national phonetic transcription. Such transcription needs the usual spelling of the word because it does not have a one-to-one correspondence.

Sẹ́verni vẹ̑tər in sȏnce sta se prepírala, katẹ́ri od njíju je močnẹ̑jši, ko je mímo prišə̏u̯ popọ́tnik, zavȋt v tópeu̯ plášč.

Orthographic version 
Such transcription is found in dictionaries meant for non-native speakers and the usual spelling of the word can be reconstructed. For any use on English Wikipedia, such transcription is favored over the one found in Slovene dictionaries.

Sẹ́verni vẹ̑tər in sȏnce sta se prepírala, katẹ́ri od njíju je močnẹ̑jši, ko je mímo prišə̏ł popọ́tnik, zavȋt v tópeł plášč.

Notes

References

Further reading 

 

Slovene language
Slavic phonologies